Stranger in the House is a 1967 crime film directed and written by Pierre Rouve (from the novel by Georges Simenon), produced by Anatole de Grunwald and starring James Mason, Geraldine Chaplin and Bobby Darin. The movie was released as Cop-Out in the USA and is a remake of the French film Strangers in the House (Les inconnus dans la maison, 1942). The film was remade in 1997.

Eric Burdon & the Animals recorded the song "Ain't That So" for the film. The song was co-written by band member Vic Briggs and the composer of the film score, John Scott. It was produced and arranged by Briggs.

Plot
John Sawyer was once a brilliant defence lawyer but his life has taken a downturn. He has become an alcoholic, his wife has left him, his sister is ashamed of him, while his daughter Angela, who still lives in his increasingly shabby large house, despises him. She follows her own life with a wild group of friends led by two rich boys, one of whom is her cousin, Desmond.

Two poor boys are also part of the gang: an American criminal on the run called Barney and a Cypriot immigrant called Jo. Angela falls for Jo. After a vicious fight with Jo, Barney is immobilised and Angela hides him in the attic of her house, where he is shot dead by an intruder. The murder weapon is planted on Jo, who is arrested and put on trial. Nobody in town wants to defend him, so Angela begs her father to do so.

John does not believe the case against Jo and starts his own investigation, through which he gradually gets his own life back together. Through careful observation and questioning, he works out who wanted Barney dead. It was his nephew Desmond, whom Barney humiliated when he hired him a whore. John confronts Desmond in his parents' house and, reading Dostoyevsky to him, makes him see that his only course is to confess. As John leaves the house, a proud and thankful Angela takes his arm.

Cast
 James Mason as John Sawyer 
 Geraldine Chaplin as Angela Sawyer 
 Bobby Darin as Barney Teale 
 Paul Bertoya as Jo Christoforides 
 Ian Ogilvy as Desmond Flower 
 Bryan Stanyon as Peter Hawkins 
 Pippa Steel as Sue Phillips 
 Clive Morton as Colonel Flower 
 Moira Lister as Mrs. Flower 
 James Hayter as Harry Hawkins 
 Megs Jenkins as Mrs. Christoforides
 Lisa Daniely as Diana Sawyer 
 Ivor Dean as Inspector Colder
 Marjie Lawrence as Brenda
 Yootha Joyce as Shooting Range Girl

Critical response
Some critics felt that, although the casting of Chaplin and Darin was meant to appeal to younger audiences, both were too old for their characters. Others thought that the title Cop-Out might have worked better (especially with audiences of the 1960s) without its trendy camera work and wearisome generation-gap propaganda.

Reception
ABC, which had co-produced the film, reported a loss of $795,000 on it.

References

External links

1967 films
Films based on Belgian novels
Films based on works by Georges Simenon
Films produced by Anatole de Grunwald
Films produced by Dimitri de Grunwald
Films scored by John Scott (composer)
British remakes of French films
British crime drama films
Films shot at MGM-British Studios
1960s English-language films
1960s British films